Cadellia is a monotypic genus of trees in the botanical family Surianaceae. The sole species, Cadellia pentastylis, commonly known as ooline, is a medium to large tree with bright green leaves and rough tile-pattern bark. It has rain forest origins dating from the Pleistocene Era when much of Australia was wetter than it is today. It grows on moderately fertile soils, preferably those suited for agriculture or pasture development. Due to extensive forest clearing, it is now considered a vulnerable plant in Australia.

Description 
The Cadellia tree grows to be about 10 m - rarely 25 m in height. It has leaves that are alternate, undivided and obovate or "oval" in shape. Flowering occurs from about October to December. The flowers have five white petals, about 5–7 mm in length. The ooline's fruit is brownish, wrinkled, and remains surrounded by five red sepals at its base. Fruiting generally occurs from November to December. The fruit's edibility for humans is not stated.

Distribution 
Cadellia pentastylis is listed as vulnerable under the Australian Environment and Biodiversity Conservation Act 1999.  Small and typically fragmented stands of Ooline may be found in scattered localities on the lower western slopes of Australia's great dividing range between latitudes of 24ºS to 30ºS.  Populations are known from the North Western Slopes of New South Wales; such as around Mount Black Jack near Gunnedah, Tenterfield, Terry Hie Hie, and Moree. Ooline can also be found in Sundown National Park and Tregole National Park in Queensland.

Taxonomy 
The Cadellia is one of four sections of the Fabales clade. Its pollen is prolate spheroidal, striate with a granular aperture surface membrane. Pollen morphology has linked the Surianaceae in a clade comprising Polygalaceae, Fabaceae, and Quillaja. There are also strong genetic affinities between the Mexican endemic genus Recchia and Cadellia. These can be determined by different types of microscopy, such as; light microscopy, scanning electro microscopy, transmission electro microscopy.

Gallery

References
 WOS:000227860100005 / Pollen morphology of families Quillajaceae and Surianaceae (Fabales)
 WOS:A1995TM23000006 / A reassessment of the familial affinity of the Mexican genus Recchia Mocino & Sesse ex DC 
 PlantNET - The Plant Information Network System of Botanic Gardens Trust, Sydney, Australia
 Curran, T.J. & Curran, S.R. (2005). Rediscovery of Ooline, Cadellia pentastylis, near Gunnedah: notes on the habitat and ecology of this dry rainforest tree. Cunninghamia 9 (2): 311-316.
 Department of Environment & Climate Change New South Wales (2005), Ooline - Profile, Accessed 18 March 2009. http://www.threatenedspecies.environment.nsw.gov.au/tsprofile/profile.aspx?id=10118 .
 Department of the Environment, Water, Heritage and the Arts (2008). Cadellia pentastylis in Species Profile and Threats Database, Department of the Environment, Water, Heritage and the Arts, Canberra. Accessed 25/09/2008.
 Harden, G.J., McDonald, W.J.F. & Williams, J.B. (2006). Rainforest trees and shrubs: a field guide to their identification in Victoria, New South Wales and subtropical Queensland using vegetative features. Gwen Harden Publishing, Nambucca Heads, NSW.
 Herbrecs (2008). Cadellia pentastylis, in BriMapper version 2.12. Queensland Herbarium. Accessed 25/09/2008.
 Pollock, A.B. (1999). Cadellia pentastylis, in Species Management Manual. Department of Natural Resources, Brisbane.
 www.nationalcapital.gov.au
https://archive.today/20121129011753/http://wetlandinfo.derm.qld.gov.au/wetlands/factsfigures/FloraAndFauna/Species/cadellia-pentastylis.html

Fabales of Australia
Trees of Australia
Flora of New South Wales
Flora of Queensland
Vulnerable flora of Australia
Monotypic Fabales genera
Surianaceae
Taxa named by Ferdinand von Mueller